Eickumer Mühlenbach (also: Kinsbeke) is a river in North Rhine-Westphalia, Germany. It flows into the Aa in Herford.

See also
List of rivers of North Rhine-Westphalia

Rivers of North Rhine-Westphalia
Rivers of Germany